Clivina niponensis is a species of ground beetle in the subfamily Scaritinae. It was described by Henry Walter Bates in 1873.

References

niponensis
Beetles described in 1873